Jean-Paul Berjeau (born 21 June 1953) is a retired French swimmer who won a silver medal in the 4 × 100 m medley relay at the 1970 European Aquatics Championships. He also competed in the 4 × 100 m medley relay and 100 m and 200 m backstroke at the 1972 Summer Olympics; his best achievement was eighth place in the 200 m event.

References

1953 births
Living people
Swimmers at the 1972 Summer Olympics
Olympic swimmers of France
French male backstroke swimmers
European Aquatics Championships medalists in swimming